King William is a census-designated place (CDP) in and the county seat of King William County, Virginia, United States. The population as of the 2010 census was 252. Located in King William is the oldest courthouse in continuous use in the United States, built in 1725. The community is also known as King William Courthouse or, by an alternative spelling, King William Court House.

The King William County Courthouse, King William Training School, Sharon Indian School, and Sweet Hall are listed on the National Register of Historic Places.

Geography
King William is slightly east of the center of King William County, along Virginia State Route 30.

The chiefs Wahunsonacock and Opechancanough are buried on the Pamunkey Indian Reservation near railroad tracks.

References

Census-designated places in King William County, Virginia
County seats in Virginia
Census-designated places in Virginia
1725 establishments in Virginia